Hamza Boukhari (born 28 March 1995) is a Dutch football player of Moroccan descent who plays for TAC '90.

Club career
He made his professional debut in the Eerste Divisie for Jong FC Utrecht on 5 August 2016 in a game against NAC Breda. He went on to play for Quick Boys, RKAVV, and TAC '90.

References

External links
 

1995 births
Living people
Footballers from The Hague
Dutch sportspeople of Moroccan descent
Association football midfielders
Dutch footballers
Jong FC Utrecht players
Eerste Divisie players